The 1832 Delaware gubernatorial election was held on November 6, 1832. This was the first gubernatorial election held under the 1831 constitution, which moved the state's general elections to November and extended the Governor's three-year term to four years, but preserved the bar on governors from succeeding themselves. Incumbent National Republican Governor David Hazzard was barred from seeking a second term. New Castle County Treasurer Caleb P. Bennett ran as the Democratic candidate to succeed Hazzard, while former State Representative Arnold Naudain ran as the National Republican candidate. Bennett narrowly defeated Naudain, winning by a margin of just 54 votes.

General election

Results

References

Bibliography
 
 
 

1832
Delaware
Gubernatorial